WEC 34: Faber vs. Pulver was a mixed martial arts event held by World Extreme Cagefighting that took place on June 1, 2008, at the ARCO Arena in Sacramento, California. The main event, announced on WEC 33, was a bout between Jens Pulver and Urijah Faber for the WEC Featherweight Championship. WEC 34 was aired live on Versus.

Background
The event drew an estimated 1,540,000 viewers on Versus, a record high for the WEC.

Richard Crunkilton was originally slated to face Donald Cerrone at this event, but he was forced from the bout with an injury and replaced by promotional newcomer Danny Castillo.

Eric Schambari was originally scheduled to face Tim McKenzie at this event, but was also injured and replaced by the debuting Jeremy Lang.

Results

Reported payout 
The following is the reported payout to the fighters as reported to the California State Athletic Commission. It does not include sponsor money or "locker room" bonuses often given by the WEC.

Urijah Faber: $44,000 (includes $22,000 win bonus) def. Jens Pulver: $33,000
Miguel Torres: $28,000 ($14,000 win bonus) def. Yoshiro Maeda: $6,000
Mark Munoz: $16,000 ($8,000 win bonus) def. Chuck Grigsby: $3,000
Rob McCullough: $32,000 ($16,000 win bonus) def. Kenneth Alexander: $3,000
Donald Cerrone: $10,000 ($5,000 win bonus) def. Danny Castillo: $3,000
Mike Brown: $10,000 ($5,000 win bonus) def. Jeff Curran: $10,000
Will Ribeiro: $6,000 ($3,000 win bonus) def. Chase Beebe: $7,000
Tim McKenzie: $12,000 ($6,000 win bonus) def. Jeremy Lang: $4,000
Alex Serdyukov: $6,000 ($3,000 win bonus) def. Luis Sapo: $3,000
José Aldo: $6,000 ($3,000 win bonus) def. Alexandre Franca Nogueira: $8,000
Dominick Cruz: $6,000 ($3,000 win bonus) def. Charlie Valencia: $7,000

See also 
 World Extreme Cagefighting
 List of World Extreme Cagefighting champions
 List of WEC events
 2008 in WEC

External links
Official WEC website

References

World Extreme Cagefighting events
Events in Sacramento, California
2008 in mixed martial arts
Mixed martial arts in Sacramento, California
Sports competitions in Sacramento, California
2008 in sports in California